2002 FIVB World Championship may refer to:

 2002 FIVB Men's World Championship
 2002 FIVB Women's World Championship